A differentiable stack is the analogue in differential geometry of an algebraic stack in algebraic geometry. It can be described either as a stack over differentiable manifolds which admits an atlas, or as a Lie groupoid up to Morita equivalence.

Differentiable stacks are particularly useful to handle spaces with singularities (i.e. orbifolds, leaf spaces, quotients), which appear naturally in differential geometry but are not differentiable manifolds. For instance, differentiable stacks have applications in foliation theory, Poisson geometry and twisted K-theory.

Definition

Definition 1 (via groupoid fibrations) 
Recall that a category fibred in groupoids (also called a groupoid fibration) consists of a category  together with a functor  to the category of differentiable manifolds such that

By construction,  is a groupoid, thus explaining the name. A stack is a groupoid fibration satisfied further glueing properties, expressed in terms of descent.

Any manifold  defines its slice category , whose objects are pairs  of a manifold  and a smooth map ; then  is a groupoid fibration which is actually also a stack. A morphism  of groupoid fibrations is called a representable submersion if

 the induce smooth map  is a submersion.

A differentiable stack is a stack  together with a special kind of representable submersion  (every submersion  described above is asked to be surjective), for some manifold . The map  is called atlas, presentation or cover of the stack .

Definition 2 (via 2-functors) 
Recall that a prestack (of groupoids) on a category , also known as a 2-presheaf, is a 2-functor , where  is the 2-category of (set-theoretical) groupoids, their morphisms, and the natural transformations between them. A stack is a prestack satisfying further glueing properties (analogously to the glueing properties satisfied by a sheaf). In order to state such properties precisely, one needs to define (pre)stacks on a site, i.e. a category equipped with a Grothendiek topology.

A stack  is called geometric if there is an object  and a morphism of stacks  (often called atlas, presentation or cover of the stack ) such that

 the induces morphism  satisfies a further property depending on the category  (e.g., for manifold it is asked to be a submersion).

Note that, replacing  with the category of affine schemes, one recovers the standard notion of algebraic stack. Similarly, replacing  with the category of topological spaces, one obtains the definition of topological stack.

Definition 3 (via Morita equivalences) 

Morita equivalence is an equivalence relation between Lie groupoids, weaker than isomorphism but strong enough to preserve many geometric properties.

Equivalence between the definitions 1 and 2 

Any fibred category  defines the 2-sheaf . Conversely, any prestack  gives rise to a category , whose objects are pairs  of a manifold  and an object , and whose morphisms are maps  such that . Such  becomes a fibred category with the functor .

The glueing properties defining a stack in the first and in the second definition are equivalent; similarly, an atlas in the sense of Definition 1 induces an atlas in the sense of Definition 2 and vice versa.

Equivalence between the definitions 2 and 3 

Any other Lie groupoid in the Morita class of  induces an isomorphic stack.

Conversely, any differentiable stack  is of the form , i.e. it can be represented by a Lie groupoid.

A theorem by Dorette Pronk states an equivalence of bicategories between differentiable stacks according to the first definition and Lie groupoids up to Morita equivalence.

Examples

 Any manifold  defines a differentiable stack , which is trivially presented by the identity morphism . The stack  corresponds to the Morita equivalence class of the unit groupoid .
The stack  corresponds to the Morita equivalence class of  seen as a Lie groupoid over a point (i.e., the Morita equivalence class of any transitive Lie groupoids with isotropy ).
 Any foliation  on a manifold  defines a differentiable stack via its leaf spaces. It corresponds to the Morita equivalence class of the holonomy groupoid .
 Any orbifold is a differentiable stack, since it is the Morita equivalence class of a proper Lie groupoid with discrete isotropies (hence finite, since isotropies of proper Lie groupoids are compact).

Quotient differentiable stack 
It is defined as the stack  associating to any manifold  the category of principal -bundles  and -equivariant maps . It is a differentiable stack presented by the stack morphism  defined for any manifold  as

where  is the -equivariant map .

The stack  corresponds to the Morita equivalence class of the action groupoid . Accordingly, one recovers the following particular cases:

 if  is a point, the differentiable stack  coincides with 
 if the action is free and proper (and therefore the quotient  is a manifold), the differentiable stack  coincides with  
 if the action is proper (and therefore the quotient  is an orbifold), the differentiable stack  coincides with the stack defined by the orbifold

Differential space

A differentiable space is a differentiable stack with trivial stabilizers. For example, if a Lie group acts freely but not necessarily properly on a manifold, then the quotient by it is in general not a manifold but a differentiable space.

With Grothendieck topology
A differentiable stack  may be equipped with Grothendieck topology in a certain way (see the reference).

Gerbes
An epimorphism between differentiable stacks  is called a gerbe over  if  is also an epimorphism. For example, if  is a stack,  is a gerbe.

References

External links 
http://ncatlab.org/nlab/show/differentiable+stack

Differential geometry